Decio López (born 1946) is a Colombian footballer. He competed in the men's tournament at the 1968 Summer Olympics.

References

1946 births
Living people
Colombian footballers
Colombia international footballers
Olympic footballers of Colombia
Footballers at the 1968 Summer Olympics
Sportspeople from Medellín
Association football defenders
Deportivo Pereira footballers
Cúcuta Deportivo managers